Wade MacNeil (born May 5, 1984) is a Canadian musician best known as the lead guitarist and backing vocalist of the post-hardcore band Alexisonfire.
He is also the vocalist of the hardcore punk band Gallows, and the vocalist/guitarist/founder of the punk band Black Lungs.

MacNeil has featured as a guest vocalist for songs by various other artists, including "St. Andrews" by Bedouin Soundclash, "Deathsmarch" by Cancer Bats (also appearing in the song's video), "Widower" by Johnny Truant, "The Gre(A)t Depression" by Anti-Flag and "She Upon the Black Wolf" by The Banner.

MacNeil was also the weekend afternoon announcer on CFNY-FM (102.1 the Edge) Toronto from November 2014 to August 2018. And appears as the radio host in the 2020 movie Random Acts of Violence.

Music career

With Alexisonfire
MacNeil co-founded Alexisonfire in fall 2001 after being phoned by Dallas Green, who asked for MacNeil's assistance in getting Green's band at the time, Helicon Blue, some shows in the area. MacNeil, having just left the band After the Hallowed Moment, had been jamming with drummer Jesse Ingelevics, and asked Green if he wanted to start a band with him. Green accepted, and the three jammed together, with both MacNeil and Green on guitar and vocals, which was later cited as the first Alexisonfire practice together. Chris Steele, who was an active member alongside MacNeil in the bands Plan 9 and After the Hallowed Moment, assumed the role of bass player. MacNeil recruited George Pettit, after having seen him perform as the bassist in the metal band Condemning Salem, a band which Pettit expressed great discontent in playing in.

With Gallows
Frank Carter, the original vocalist of UK hardcore band Gallows, announced in early July 2011 that he would be leaving Gallows because of differing opinions in writing the band's follow-up album to their second release Grey Britain. His departure was effective from August 1, after the band's final tour dates. Just eight days after Frank's departure, on August 9, 2011, MacNeil was confirmed as the new Gallows vocalist. MacNeil has stated that the members of Gallows asked him initially out of coincidence that Alexisonfire had disbanded and Gallows needed a new singer. The band completed a debut release with Wade, Death Is Birth, a four track extended play which was released on December 13 that year. The EP was sold as a 7" vinyl record. A music video for "True Colours" was released, and "Mondo Chaos" was released in a single format. Gallows have announced the release date of their eponymous third album to be September 10, 2012. The album was produced, mixed and mastered by Spycatcher members Thomas Mitchener and Steve Sears at Watford's Broadfields Studio and will be released via the band's new label Venn Records in partnership with PIAS Recordings. The album will also be released and distributed in the United States through Bridge Nine Records. It is the first Gallows full-length to feature MacNeil on lead vocals and the second official release overall after 2011's Death Is Birth EP.

With Dooms Children
In May 2021, MacNeil teased his new psychedelic rock project Dooms Children. The first single titled "Flower Moon" was first heard on Daniel P Carter's BBC radio 1 show, aired on May 23.

During an interview with Wall of Sound, MacNeil spoke about his duties in Dooms Children, stating "I've always considered myself a songwriter and a singer but just maybe in the projects that I've been involved in the most, that's not what anybody else thinks,"

In film
Wade is credited as a composer for Goon: Last of the Enforcers. After attending a Montreal Canadiens game with Jay Baruchel, Wade created songs for the film, that he describes as "to be all things that sound like you could turn up to 10 in an arena."

In 2018, Wade partnered with Andrew Gordon Macpherson to create the score for the film The Ranger.

In video games
Wade again partnered with Andrew Gordon Macpherson in 2018 to create the soundtrack to Far Cry 5's arcade mode.

Equipment

Gibson Les Paul Junior
Gibson Les Paul Custom (Silverburst)
Morris Amps (unknown model)
Orange RockerVerb 100
Marshall JCM2000 TSL100 head
 HiWatt (Warped Tour)
Orange 4x12 cabinet
Gibson Marauder in Vintage Green
Gibson SG Standard in TobaccoBurst
Gibson Les Paul Standard in Heritage Cherry (with open coil humbuckers)
Schecter Corsair 6 TobaccoBurst
Schecter S-1 Antique Ivory
Gibson ES-335s (Various colours)
Epiphone Sheraton (as seen in the video for Young Cardinals)
Fender Jazzmaster (as seen in Alexisonfire's Reading 2015 set)
Gibson Custom Flying V

References

External links
[ Alexisonfire] at Allmusic.
Alexisonfire's Official Site

Alexisonfire members
1984 births
Living people
Canadian punk rock guitarists
Canadian punk rock singers
Musicians from Hamilton, Ontario
21st-century Canadian guitarists
21st-century Canadian male singers